Turn the Page is an album by American country music artist Waylon Jennings, released on RCA Records in 1985.

Background
Jennings recorded the album at a time when he was completely drug-free; this had not occurred in his career for about twenty years.  In April 1984, Jennings rented a house in Arizona for himself, his wife Jessi Colter, and young son Shooter, and quit cocaine cold turkey, although he did not intend to quit for good. Jennings was inspired to remain drug free mainly because of his son. In the audio version of his autobiography Waylon, Jennings recalled that quitting drugs had an immediate effect on his music: "I hit better notes now that I wasn't plagued with laryngitis.  I played on the beat instead of ahead of it.  Probably only I noticed that instead of pushing myself, I was being pulled along by my own legend and the skills I'd learned from a lifetime performing."

Recording and composition
Turn the Page features a far more committed effort from Jennings than had been evident on some of his recent studio albums, with more care given to the production and vocal arrangements, as is evident on the opening track "The Devil's on the Loose."  A sense of rejuvenation permeates much of the album, with Jennings celebrating his sobriety on "You Showed Me Somethin' About Livin'" and "Don't Bring It Around Anymore."  "Good Morning John" is a tribute song to Johnny Cash written by Kris Kristofferson.  The cheating song "Broken Promise Land" was later a single for Mark Chesnutt from his 1991 album Too Cold at Home.

Jennings had always recorded a wide range of eclectic material throughout his career, and since the late 1970s he had been including well known pop and rock songs on his albums. This album is no exception, featuring the Bob Seger title cut about the grind of a musician's life on the road (something Jennings knew all too well) and "Rhiannon," a smash hit for Fleetwood Mac written by lead vocalist Stevie Nicks for their self-titled album of 1975.  Waylon had covered Nicks before when he recorded "Gold Dust Woman" for the 1978 LP Waylon and Willie, and Nicks also wrote "Leather and Lace" for Waylon's 1982 duet album with Colter but kept the song for herself and made it a top single for her 1981 debut solo album Bella Donna.

Reception
Turn the Page, the second-to-last studio album Jennings would release for RCA at a point when the demand for his music had already diminished significantly, reached #23 on the Billboard country albums chart.  The album produced one hit: "Drinkin' and Dreamin,'" which reached #2, and #26 in Canada.

Track listing
"The Devil's on the Loose" (Larry Willoughby)
"You Showed Me Somethin' About Lovin'" (Phil Redrow)
"Good Morning John" (Kris Kristofferson)
"The Broken Promise Land" (Bill Rice, Sharon Vaughn)
"Don't Bring It Around Anymore" (Gary Nicholson, Marshall Morgan, Nancy Montgomery, Walter McEuen)
"Rhiannon" (Stevie Nicks)
"Drinkin' and Dreamin'" (Troy Seals, Max D. Barnes) – 2:59
"As Far as the Eye Can See" (Billy Gale)
"Turn the Page" (Bob Seger) – 4:37
"Those Kind of Memories" (Jim McBride, Stewart Harris)

Bonus tracks
"America" (Sammy Johns)

Production
Producer: Jerry Bridges, Gary Scruggs
Art Direction: Tal Howell
Cover Photography: Jim McGuire

Personnel
Pickers: Waylon Jennings, Ralph Mooney, Jerry Bridges, Gary Scruggs, Floyd Domino, Dan Mustoe, Sony Curtis, Wayne Jackson
Singers: Waylon Jennings, Patti Leatherwood, Kay Milete, Colleen Peterson, Bonnie Gallie

Chart performance

References

External links
 Waylon Jennings' Official Website

Waylon Jennings albums
1985 albums
RCA Records albums